Cesare Lanza (born 8 July 1942) is an Italian journalist and author.

Born in Cosenza, Lanza started working as a journalist at fourteen years old.  In 1976 he became the director of Il Secolo XIX and later he directed several other newspapers and magazines.  In 1976 he debuted as an author with the novel Nenè, which one year later was adapted by Salvatore Samperi into a film with the same name. In 2008 he made his directorial debut with the drama film La Perfezionista. He is also a television author.

References

External links
 

Living people
Italian journalists
Italian male journalists
1942 births
Italian male writers
People from Cosenza
Italian television writers
Male screenwriters
Male television writers